Michael Wright is an artist and painter and working in both traditional and electronic media. He holds a BFA in Painting and Drawing and a BA in European History from the University of Washington, Seattle. He began his career as a painter, but began to explore Digital Media in the mid 1980s on an Amiga computer. He exhibited his first Digital Prints in 1989 and continues to work in both traditional and electronic media.

His work has exhibited included in exhibitions, articles, and books including The Computer in the Visual Arts by Anne Morgan Spalter and Cyberarts: Exploring Art & Technology by Linda Jacobs. He and his work have been featured on Agent X, Television Tokyo, at "ACM 1:Beyond Cyberspace" in San Jose in March 2001. He was also featured at "CyberArts X" and "The Impact of YLEM: 20 Years of Art, Science and Technology" both in San Francisco 2001, and "Computer Graphics World" 25th Anniversary Retrospective" in January 2002. Howard Fox, curator of modern art for the Los Angeles County Museum of Art has called Wright's digital work, "Down and dirty, with underlying tension. "Elizabeth A. T. Smith, former curator at the Los Angeles Museum of Modern Art, called Wright's work, "powerful, evocative, an equally charged carrier of meaning about memory, time and transformation." Wright's digital work is represented by the Spectra Digital Arts Gallery in New York City.

Wright is a professor in the Digital Media and Liberal Studies Programs at Otis College of Art and Design in Los Angeles. He has also taught at California State University Los Angeles. He formally served on the Siggraph Education Committee and the Siggraph Traveling Exhibition Committee. Wright also instructs on a regular basis for the Los Angeles County Museum of Art. In 1990, he was awarded a grant from the Cultural Affairs Department of the city of Los Angeles.

Selected bibliography
 Beil, Kim. "’Hacking the Timeline’ at the 18th Street Arts Center," ARTWEEK April 2006 
 Ruben, Cynthia. "’Hacking the Timeline’ at the 18th Street Arts Center,"  DASH, London UK
 Dolores Glover Kaufman & Joe Nalven. SIGGRAPH/L.A. 2005, September 2005 
 Ruben, Cynthia Beth. "Digital By Choice: Imaging In The Pre-Photoshop Era," Leonardo Electronic Almanac, May 2005
 Masucci, Michael. "Quantum Entanglement and the EZTV Online Museum," Computer Graphics, 2004  
 Eber, Dena. "SIGGRAPH 2003 Art Gallery: Balancing the Technological Ethos," [www.intelligentagent.com Intelligent Agent], Summer/Fall '03
 Gervers, Janet. "SIGGRAPH Culture Experiences: SIGGRAPH Conference 2003," Computer Graphics 
 Moltenbrey, Karen. "SIGGRAPH Art Gallery," Computer Graphics World, June 2003, pp. 40–43 
 "25 Year Retrospective: Digital Art," Computer Graphics World, January 2002, pp. 18–23
 Moltenbrey, Karen. "Pixel Perfect: Michael Wright," Computer Graphics World, November 2001, pp. 44–45
 Sanchez, Andres. "Los Artistas Desconocidos Tienen un Sitio en la Red," @RROBA, June 2001, pp 58–59, 
 Luster, Gary. "Artist Produces Digital Paintings on Amiga," Micro Publishing News, December 1997, p. 70

External links
 M Ragsdale Wright Studios
 Portfolio

Living people
American contemporary artists
Otis College of Art and Design faculty
Year of birth missing (living people)